Donata Govoni married Sandrini (born 4 March 1944) is a former Italian sprinter and middle distance runner.

Biography
Govoni began her career as a 100–200 m sprinter and then moved progressively to 400 metres and 800 metres. From 1961 to 1972 she took part in 49 international competitions, including the 1968 and 1972 Olympics.

Achievements

National titles
Donata Govoni has won 26 times the individual national championship from 1961 to 1975. In Italy only two women did better: Agnese Maffeis (38) and Marisa Masullo (30).

See also
 Italian Athletics Championships – Women multi winners

References

External links
 

1944 births
Sportspeople from the Metropolitan City of Bologna
Italian female sprinters
Italian female middle-distance runners
Athletes (track and field) at the 1968 Summer Olympics
Athletes (track and field) at the 1972 Summer Olympics
Olympic athletes of Italy
Living people
Mediterranean Games silver medalists for Italy
Athletes (track and field) at the 1967 Mediterranean Games
Mediterranean Games medalists in athletics
Italian Athletics Championships winners
Olympic female sprinters
20th-century Italian women
21st-century Italian women